Albert Cummings (born Williamstown, Massachusetts, United States) is an American blues musician who has recorded under Blind Pig Records. He has played alongside B.B. King, Johnny Winter, and Buddy Guy.

Biography
Cummings started playing the five-string banjo at the age of twelve. He started to learn basic chords and progressions and became a fan of bluegrass music. In his late teens, he encountered the early recordings of Stevie Ray Vaughan. While in college, in 1987, he saw Vaughan perform. His first public guitar performance was in 1997 when he played at his friends wedding reception. In Cummings' late twenties, he formed a band, Swamp Yankee. In 1999, he released an independently produced album, The Long Way. The trio spent two hours in a recording studio to record the nine songs for the album.

After the release, the band went on the Northeast blues circuit. In 1998, he walked into a Northeast Blues Society open jam. In 1999 the musician competed in the Blues Foundation's International Blues Challenge, in Memphis. The following year, he released his debut recording. 

He later worked with Double Trouble, the late Stevie Ray Vaughan's rhythm section. Bassist Tommy Shannon and drummer Chris Layton volunteered to play on and produce Cummings' solo debut recording, 2003’s self-released From the Heart. Recorded in Austin, Texas, it featured Cummings fronting Double Trouble (including Reese Wynans) in their first recording project since Stevie Ray’s passing.

Cummings was signed to Blind Pig Records in 2004 with a multi-album deal. Only Shannon remained as the bassist for Cummings' next album, True To Yourself  in 2004.

In 2006, Cummings recorded a fourth album Working Man, with new band members.

In 2008, Cummings released a live album Feels So Good, recorded at the Colonial Theatre in Pittsfield, Massachusetts.

In 2011, Cummings released an instructional DVD for the Hal Leonard Corporation entitled, Working Man Blues Guitar. His 2012 album No Regrets debuted at No. 1 in the U.S., Canada and France on the iTunes Blues Charts and at No. 5 on the Billboard blues charts. In a 2012 interview, he called No Regrets his "best album yet".

In July 2015, Cummings released Someone Like You, a 12-track Blind Pig album produced by David Z.

In February 2020, Cummings released his 11-track Provogue Records debut titled Believe, produced by Grammy Award-winning producer Jim Gaines. Recorded at FAME Studios in Muscle Shoals, Alabama, Cummings notes the influence the location had on the process of creating this project, “If I had recorded those same songs anywhere else, then Believe would have sounded like a completely different album.” Arguably one of the most notable tracks on the album is a cover of the song Hold On by legendary soul duo Sam & Dave.

On April 8, 2022, Cummings released 10, a 13-track Ivy Music Company album produced by Grammy Award-winning producer Chuck Ainlay. Simply described as "the blues rocker's gone country", it features discovered depth and complexity within a new style.

Discography
 The Long Way (Albert Cummings and Swamp Yankee), 2000
 From the Heart, 2003
 True to Yourself, 2004
 Working Man, 2006
 Feel So Good, 2008
No Regrets, 2012
 Someone Like You, 2015
Believe, 2020
10, 2022

References

External links
Official Albert Cummings Official Site 
facebook.com/albertcummingsmusic/
youtube.com/user/ACummingsOfficial
Blind Pig Records Official Site
2005 Interview with Brian D. Holland of Modern Guitars Magazine
Elmore Magazine Someone Like You 2015 article
 

Living people
American blues guitarists
American male guitarists
American blues singers
Singers from Massachusetts
People from Williamstown, Massachusetts
20th-century American male singers
20th-century American singers
21st-century American male singers
21st-century American singers
20th-century American guitarists
21st-century American guitarists
Guitarists from Massachusetts
Blind Pig Records artists
Year of birth missing (living people)
Provogue Records artists